Herbert Krug (21 June 1937 – 1 November 2010) was a German equestrian and Olympic champion. He won a gold medal in team dressage at the 1984 Summer Olympics in Los Angeles. He was born in Mainz and died in Hochheim am Main.

References

1937 births
2010 deaths
German dressage riders
Olympic equestrians of West Germany
German male equestrians
Olympic gold medalists for West Germany
Equestrians at the 1984 Summer Olympics
Olympic medalists in equestrian
Medalists at the 1984 Summer Olympics
Sportspeople from Mainz